"Messy in Heaven" is a song by British singer Venbee and producer Goddard. It was released on 23 September 2022 through Sony and achieved commercial success in Ireland, New Zealand and the United Kingdom, peaking at nine and three, respectively.

Background and reception
The song is the second single release by 21-year old Chatham singer Venbee, having debuted her first single in May 2022. The lyrics are based on a dream she had of Jesus walking down "High Street looking very intoxicated". She then told the co-writers about the dream and wrote the song. According to her, the song is not meant to offend anyone but about how the "best people put others before themselves". However, Venbee clarified that the song was meant to be an "anti-drug anthem". She realised that the topic at hand is controversial but "also a conversation starter".

The song reached number three on the UK Singles Chart, having simultaneously amassed over 15 million global streams by December 2022.

Composition
"Messy in Heaven" is a "thrilling, cathartic drum 'n' bass" that reimagines Jesus "placed into a modern-day situation". The track starts with soft piano chords, that later transcend "into a dance track", characterised by Venbee's "signature sound".

Charts

Certifications

References

2022 singles
2022 songs